The Children's Echelon is a twenty-six page unpublished story by J. D. Salinger from 1944. It can be located in the Firestone Library in Princeton University.

Summary
The story is in the form of eleven diary entries by Bernice Herndon with the first entry on January 12, her 18th birthday, and the last on March 25 of the same but unspecified year. With the war escalating in the background, Bernice changes her opinion about almost everything she mentions - her friends, family, and the war. In one entry, Bernice, like Holden Caulfield, mentions that she loved to watch children at the merry-go-round. (Bernice recalls the time at the carousel when "one darling little boy in a navy blue suit and beanie...nearly fell off the horse once and I nearly screamed.")

History 

Donald Fiene notes that this story was sold to Stag magazine in 1942, but that it is "no longer in the files." Fiene, however, incorrectly confuses several stories with this year. This appears to be one of them and is certainly Salinger's 1944 piece "Total War Diary." Salinger struggled with this piece, trying at first to avoid both the first person narrative and the diary format that the story eventually adopted.

References

Short stories by J. D. Salinger
1944 short stories